Kotelnoye is a rural locality (a village) in Vakhnevskoye Rural Settlement, Nikolsky District, Vologda Oblast, Russia. The population was 187 as of 2002.

Geography 
Kotelnoye is located 44 km northwest of Nikolsk (the district's administrative centre) by road. Kamennoye is the nearest rural locality.

References 

Rural localities in Nikolsky District, Vologda Oblast